Geddis may refer to:

 Andrew Geddis, business man and sports enthusiast in Bombay prior to Indian independence
 David Geddis,  former professional football player turned football coach and scout
 Jeff Geddis, Canadian film and television actor
 Joel Geddis, American record producer
 William Duncan Geddis, a unionist politician in Northern Ireland
 William John Geddis, member of the New Zealand Legislative Council